is a 1991 Japanese kaiju film written and directed by Kazuki Ōmori and produced by Shōgo Tomiyama. The film, produced and distributed by Toho Studios, is the 18th film in the Godzilla franchise, and is the third film in the franchise's Heisei period. The film features the fictional monster characters Godzilla and King Ghidorah, and stars Kōsuke Toyohara, Anna Nakagawa, Megumi Odaka, Katsuhiko Sasaki, Akiji Kobayashi, Yoshio Tsuchiya, and Robert Scott Field. The plot revolves around time-travelers from the future who convince Japan to travel back in time to prevent Godzilla's mutation, only to reveal their true motives by unleashing King Ghidorah onto the nation.

The production crew of Godzilla vs. King Ghidorah remained largely unchanged from that of the previous film in the series, Godzilla vs. Biollante. Because the previous installment was a box office disappointment, due to a lack of child viewership and alleged competition with the Back to the Future franchise, the producers of Godzilla vs. King Ghidorah were compelled to create a film with more fantasy elements, along with time travel.

Godzilla vs. King Ghidorah was the first Godzilla film since 1975's Terror of Mechagodzilla to feature a newly orchestrated score by Akira Ifukube. The film was released theatrically in Japan on December 14, 1991, and was followed by Godzilla vs. Mothra the following year. It was released direct-to-video in North America in 1998 by Columbia TriStar Home Entertainment. Though Godzilla vs. King Ghidorah was more financially successful than Godzilla vs. Biollante, the film attracted controversy outside Japan due to its perceived Japanese nationalist themes.

Plot
In 1992, Godzilla is still weakened after being infected by the ANEB (Anti-Nuclear Energy Bacteria). Meanwhile, science fiction author Kenichiro Terasawa is writing a book about the monster and learns of a group of Japanese soldiers stationed on Lagos Island during the Gilbert and Marshall Islands campaign. In February 1944, while threatened by American forces, the Japanese soldiers were saved by a mysterious dinosaur, which Terasawa theorizes was subsequently mutated into Godzilla in 1954 after a hydrogen bomb test on the island. Yasuaki Shindo, a wealthy businessman and army veteran who commanded the Lagos Garrison, confirms that the dinosaur did indeed exist.

Meanwhile, a UFO lands on Mount Fuji. When the JSDF investigates, they are greeted by Wilson, Grenchiko, Emmy Kano, and the android M-11. The visitors, known as the "Futurians", explain that they are from the year 2204, where Godzilla has completely destroyed Japan. The Futurians plan to travel back in time to 1944 and remove the dinosaur from Lagos Island before the island is irradiated, thus preventing the mutation of the creature into Godzilla. As proof of their story, Emmy presents a copy of Terasawa's book, which has not yet been completed in the present.

The Futurians, Terasawa, Miki Saegusa, and Professor Mazaki, board a time shuttle and travel back to 1944 to Lagos Island. There, as American forces land and engage the Japanese forces commanded by Shindo, the dinosaur attacks and kills the American soldiers. The U.S. Navy then bombs the dinosaur from the sea and gravely wounds it. After Shindo and his men leave the island, M-11 teleports the dinosaur from Lagos Island to the Bering Strait. Before returning to 1992, the Futurians secretly leave three small creatures called Dorats on Lagos Island, which are exposed to radiation from the hydrogen bomb test in 1954 and merge to become King Ghidorah. After returning to 1992, the Futurians use King Ghidorah to subjugate Japan and issue an ultimatum, but Japan refuses to surrender.

Feeling sympathy for the Japanese people, Emmy reveals to Terasawa the truth behind the Futurians' mission: in the future, Japan is an economic superpower that has surpassed the United States, Russia, and China, and even bought out the entirety of South America and Africa. The Futurians traveled back in time in order to change history and prevent Japan's future economic dominance by creating King Ghidorah and using it to destroy present-day Japan. At the same time, they also planned to erase Godzilla from history so that it would not pose a threat to their plans. After M-11 brings Emmy back to the UFO, she reprograms the android so it will help her.

Shindo plans to send his nuclear submarine to the Bering Strait and irradiate the dinosaur in order to recreate Godzilla. However, Terasawa discovers too late that a Russian nuclear submarine sank there in the 1970s and released enough radiation to mutate the dinosaur into Godzilla. En route to the Bering Strait, Shindo's submarine is destroyed by Godzilla, who absorbs its radiation, recovers from the ANEB and becomes larger. Godzilla arrives in Japan and is met by King Ghidorah. They fight at equal strength, each immune to the other's attacks. With M-11 and Terasawa's aid, Emmy sabotages the UFO's control over King Ghidorah, causing the three-headed monster to lose focus during the battle. Godzilla eventually ends the battle by blasting off Ghidorah's middle head. Before sending King Ghidorah crashing into the Sea of Okhotsk, Godzilla destroys the UFO, killing Wilson and Grenchiko. It then turns its attention to Tokyo, destroying the city and killing Shindo.

Emmy travels to the future with M-11 and returns to the present day with Mecha-King Ghidorah, a cybernetic version of King Ghidorah. The cybernetic Ghidorah blasts Godzilla with beams, which proves useless. Godzilla then counters by relentlessly blasting Ghidorah with its atomic breath before Ghidorah launches clamps to restrain Godzilla. Ghidorah carries Godzilla out of Japan, but Godzilla breaks from its restraints and causes Ghidorah to send both crashing into the ocean. Emmy then returns to the future, but not before informing Terasawa that she is his descendant.

At the bottom of the ocean, Godzilla awakens and roars over Mecha-King Ghidorah's remains before swimming away.

Cast

Production

Conception
Although the previously filmed Godzilla vs. Biollante had been the most expensive Godzilla film produced at the time, its low audience attendance and loss of revenue convinced executive producer and Godzilla series creator Tomoyuki Tanaka to revitalize the series by bringing back iconic monsters from pre-1984 Godzilla movies, specifically Godzilla's archenemy King Ghidorah.

Godzilla vs. Biollante director and writer Kazuki Ōmori had initially hoped to start a standalone series centered on Mothra, and was in the process of rewriting a 1990 script for the unrealized film Mothra vs. Bagan. The film was ultimately scrapped by Toho, under the assumption that, unlike Godzilla, Mothra would have been a difficult character to market overseas. The planning stages for a sequel to Godzilla vs. Biollante were initially hampered by Tanaka's deteriorating health, thus prompting the takeover of Shōgo Tomiyama as producer. The new producer felt that the financial failure of Godzilla vs. Biollante was due to the plot being too sophisticated for child audiences, and thus intended to return some of the fantasy elements of the pre-1984 Godzilla films to the series. Ōmori himself blamed the lackluster performance of Godzilla vs. Biollante on competition with Back to the Future Part II, and thus concluded that audiences wanted plots involving time travel. His approach to the film also differed from Godzilla vs. Biollante in his greater emphasis on developing the personalities of the monsters rather than the human characters.

Akira Ifukube agreed to compose the film's score on the insistence of his daughter, after as he was dissatisfied with the way his compositions had been treated in Godzilla vs. Biollante.

Special effects

The Godzilla suits used in Godzilla vs. Biollante were reused in Godzilla vs. King Ghidorah, though with slight modifications. The original suit used for land-based and full body shots had its head replaced with a wider and flatter one, and the body cut in half. The upper half was used in scenes where Godzilla emerges from the sea and during close-ups during the character's first fight with King Ghidorah. The suit used previously for scenes set at sea was modified with rounder shoulders, a more prominent chest, and an enhanced face, and was used throughout the majority of the film's Godzilla scenes.

The redesigned King Ghidorah featured much more advanced wirework puppetry than its predecessors, and effects team leader Koichi Kawakita designed the "Godzillasaurus" as a more paleontologically accurate-looking dinosaur than Godzilla itself as a nod to American filmmakers aspiring to direct their own Godzilla films with the intention of making the monster more realistic. Ōmori's original draft specified that the dinosaur that would become Godzilla was a Tyrannosaurus, though this was rejected by creature designer Shinji Nishikawa, who stated that he "couldn't accept that a tyrannosaur could become Godzilla". The final suit combined features of Tyrannosaurus with Godzilla, and real octopus blood was used during the bombardment scene. Because the Godzillasaurus' arms were much smaller than Godzilla's, suit performer Wataru Fukuda had to operate them with levers within the costume. The creature's distress calls were recycled Gamera cries.

Home media
The Columbia/TriStar Home Video DVD version was released in 1998 as a single disc double feature with Godzilla vs. Mothra. The picture was full frame (1.33:1) [NTSC] and the audio in English (2.0). There were no subtitles. Extras included the trailer for Godzilla vs. King Ghidorah and Godzilla vs. Mothra.

The Sony Blu-ray version was released on May 6, 2014 as a two-disc double feature with Godzilla vs. Mothra. The picture was MPEG-4 AVC (1.85:1) [1080p] and the audio was in Japanese and English (DTS-HD Master Audio 2.0). Subtitles were added in English, English SDH and French. Extras included the theatrical trailer and three teasers in HD with English subtitles.

Reception
Joseph Savitski of Beyond Hollywood said "This entry in the popular monster series is a disappointing and flawed effort unworthy of the “Godzilla” name." Film historian and critic David Kalat wrote "Despite its shortcomings, illogic, and overpopulated cast, Godzilla vs. King Ghidorah is crammed full of ideas, richly visualized innovations, a genuine spirit of fun, and some of the most complex emotional manipulation ever to grace the series."

Controversy
The film was considered controversial at the time of its release, being contemporary to a period of economic tension between America and Japan, but mainly due to its fictional World War II depictions. Gerald Glaubitz of the Pearl Harbor Survivors Association appeared alongside director Kazuki Ōmori on Entertainment Tonight and condemned the film as being in "very poor taste" and detrimental to American-Japanese relations. Ishirō Honda also criticized Ōmori, stating that the scene in which Godzilla attacks and crushes American G.I.s went "too far". Conversely, Godzilla historian Steve Ryfle said American media reports of supposed anti-Americanism "weren't really thought-provoking or insightful." Ōmori has denied all such allegations, stating that the American extras in the film had been "happy about being crushed and squished by Godzilla." Commenting on the controversy in 2006, Ōmori stated:

References

External links

 
 
 

1991 films
1990s Japanese-language films
1990s monster movies
1991 science fiction films
Android (robot) films
Films about dinosaurs
Films about dragons
Films about nuclear war and weapons
Films about time travel
Films directed by Kazuki Ōmori
Films produced by Tomoyuki Tanaka
Films scored by Akira Ifukube
Films set in 1944
Films set in 1992
Films set in the 23rd century
Films set in Fukuoka
Films set in Hiroshima
Films set in Sapporo
Films set in Tokyo
Films set in Yokkaichi
Films set in the Marshall Islands
Films set in the Pacific Ocean
Films set on fictional islands
Giant monster films
Godzilla films
Japanese sequel films
Kaiju films
Mecha films
Japanese robot films
Submarine films
TriStar Pictures films
Toho films
Japanese World War II films
Pacific War films
1990s English-language films
1990s Japanese films